Aspidoscelis calidipes, the Tepalcatepec Valley whiptail, is a species of teiid lizard endemic to Mexico.

References

calidipes
Reptiles described in 1955
Taxa named by William Edward Duellman
Reptiles of Mexico